Pow/L.C.S. (stylized as PoW!/L.C.S.) is the second extended play (EP) by Japanese–American female duo FEMM. It was released on February 3, 2016 by Avex Music Creative Inc. and February 23 that same year by Avex Music Creative and JPU Records. The EP is a follow-up companion to their debut album, Femm-Isation. FEMM worked with a few producers and writers such as Harry Sommerdahl, Alex Ridha, members of Invaderous & Sfpr, and others. Musically, Pow/L.C.S. is an electronic dance music EP with numerous musical elements including rap, R&B, and remix material. Originally to be released as a stand-alone EP, it was instead released in four formats; an stand alone CD, a digital release (not including the remixes), and two double album formats with Femm-Isation. The artwork for Pow/L.C.S. has FEMM on set of their music video "PoW!".

The material from Pow/L.C.S. received generally positive reviews from music critics. Many critics commended the album's commercial appeal, the clever lyric delivery, and the overall production and composition. The EP, alongside its accompanying singles and FEMM's visual imagery, achieved further attention through Asian and Western media. Two promotional singles were released from the album. The lead promotional single, "Pow!", was positively received from fans and critics alike, despite the lack of commercial achievement; This also attributed to the following single, "L.C.S.".

Background and development
In early December 2015, FEMM confirmed in a press release through Avex Group Inc. that they would release their debut physical album, which was revealed to be entitled Pow!/L.C.S.. The announcement comes after FEMM's appearance at Japan's YouTube FanFest concert in November 2015. FEMM confirmed the EP would include two new tracks; "Pow!" and "L.C.S." and old remixes of their previous singles; they commented that they would add new re-edited versions of different tracks that did not appear on their debut studio, Femm-Isation (2014). In late January 2016, FEMM announced through a press release with Avex Group Inc. that they would release a double album in late February 2016 that included a physical copy of Femm-Isation. Regarding the material, FEMM agent Honey-B stated "The original order of the songs was already carefully mapped out, but this time round we got to put in segues in between songs which made a big difference. The songs flow so smoothly, it will seem like it all happens in a split second and like you have travelled in time."

The recording of the new material took place during late 2015, at Prime Sound Studios with Hideaki Junbu. FEMM worked with a few producers and writers for the new material such as Harry Sommerdahl, Alex Ridha, members of Invaderous & Sfpr, and additional production by Stace James. The re-edited and remixed material had been recorded from 2013 (with "UFO" being the first recorded track), up until September 2014 with the remix of "Whiplash". The Japanese version of "Astroboy" had been recorded at Maximum 10 Studio's with 70-Ki Ksow, FEMM's first recording outside of Prime Sound Studio's. Final mastering of the album was handled by Tom Coyle at Sterling Sound Studios in New York City.

Composition
Pow/L.C.S. is an electronic dance album with numerous musical elements including rap, R&B, and remix material. The first track "Pow!" is a dance-pop song "packed with aggressive lyrics", and has been described as "one of the two brand new tracks incorporates a unique style that FEMM calls 'Twist and Twerk', combining the twosome’s futuristic take on the twerk dance phenomena with that of classic 60’s dance craze The Twist." 

"L.C.S." is an abbreviation of the words" Lights, Camera, Satisfaction"; the song has been described as a "funky and hard floor tune...". FEMM's 2014 single "Astroboy" was recorded in Japanese language, marking the first time FEMM recorded in Japanese language; both FEMM's agents Honey-B and W-Trouble wrote partial parts of the lyrics because of it being sung in Japanese. 

The rest of the tracks from the physical release include remixes of "Party All Night", "Kill the DJ", "Kiss the Rain", and "Whiplash". The EP features two new mixes: a remix of "Fxxk Boyz Get Money" and the video version of "UFO". "UFO" samples Japanese female duo Pink Lady's 1977 single of the same name. 

The second disc features tracks from Femm-Isation; this album is primarily an electronic dance album with numerous elements of rap, synthpop, and J-pop.

Release and packaging
Pow!/L.C.S. was released in four different formats on February 3 and February 23, 2016 by Avex Music Creative Inc. and JPU Records. The standalone CD features the ten tracks in a jewel case; first press editions features an obi strip. The double album packaging, which features Femm-Isation, features the ten tracks on a first disc, and thirteen tracks on the second disc. First press editions features an obi strip, front cover stickers showing accolades of the track "Pow!" and a bonus lyrical booklet in Japanese language. A second double album package features ten tracks on one disc, and the second disc includes a blank CD-R disc; the second disc is where people have the option to burn the digital release of Femm-Isation from its original October 2014 release. First press editions features an obi strip, front cover stickers showing accolades of the track "Pow!" and a bonus lyrical booklet in Japanese language. Both double album packages were released in singular jewel cases. The final format is the digital release, that includes only "Pow!", "L.C.S.", the Japanese version to "Astroboy", the remix to "Fxxk Boyz Get Money", and the video version of "UFO".

One artwork was issued for Pow!/L.C.S.; The cover sleeve features FEMM in front of enlarged mushrooms, superimposed on a pink backdrop. The artwork was shot whilst recording the music video to their single "Pow!", which features prominent themes of comic book–style and the pop art movement. The cover sleeve and photo shoot was photographed by Japanese photographer and designer Hideyuki Hashimoto, whilst the design production and art direction was handled by Japanese designer Midori Kawano. FEMM's outfit's, inspired by cosplay and its corresponding culture Otaku, were designed by GM Atelier designer Shoichiro Matsuoka; GM Atelier are responsible in designing several outfits for FEMM's music videos and photo shoots.

Promotion

Remix singles
Despite no independent release of "UFO", the re-edited composition from Pow!/L.C.S. was used as the single release and was included in the accompanying music video. The extended edit was featured on their debut extended play Astroboy. The sfpr remix to "Party All Night" was released as the album's first promotional remix single on August 27, 2014, alongside their debut remix single overall. Despite its release, the song failed to enter any music charts. No video was made for the remix version, but an accompanying music video for the original composition was shot; its features FEMM in a futuristic world and in a small room. The Invaderous remix to "Kill the DJ" was released as the album's second promotional remix single on August 27, 2014. No music video was produced for this remix, but a video was released for the original version. The sfpr remix to "Whiplash", alongside the original and Invaderous remix, was released as the album's third equal promotional remix single on September 17, 2014, and third and fourth remix single respectively. Despite its release, the song failed to enter any music charts. No music video for either remix singles were issued, but an accompanying music video for the original composition was shot; its features FEMM in a black latex uniform, dancing with back-up dancers on a stage.

Track list

All formats
 Double album – Re-released under the title PoW!/LCS + Femm-Isation; Consists of ten tracks on one disc, and thirteen tracks from Femm-Isation on the second disc. Includes a bonus t-shirt and poster.

Credits and personnel
Credits adapted from the liner notes of PoW!/LCS + Femm-Isation.

Emily Kaiho – (FEMM band member; RiRi and Honey-B agent); lead vocals, backing vocals
Hiro Todo – (FEMM band member; LuLa and W-Trouble agent); lead vocals, backing vocals
Alex James - song writing, producing
Mark Weinberg – song writing, producing
Tania Doko – song writing
Andrew Richard Smith – song writing, producing
Brian Lee – song writing, producing
Stuart Critchon – song writing
Ruby Rose – song writing
Jorge Mhondera – song writing
Harry Sommerdahl - song writing, producing
Ben Preston – song writing, producing
Sofia Toufa – song writing
Scott Stallone – song writing, producing
Dan Book – song writing, producing
Alexei Misoul – song writing, producing
Leah Haywood – song writing
Daniel James – song writing
Chris Rojas – song writing
Dreamlab – producing
Evan Bogart – song writing, producing
Bryan Michael Cox – song writing, producing

Emanual Kiriakou – song writing, producing
Brandon Lowery – song writing, producing
Dan Omelio – song writing, producing
Andreas Carlsson – song writing, producing
Markus Bøgelund – song writing, producing
Danielle Senior – song writing, producing
Patrick Lukens – song writing, producing
Nicole Tranquillo – song writing, producing
Daniel Fält – song writing
Johannes Jorgensen – song writing
Grace Tither – song writing
GL Music – producing
Scott Cutler – song writing, producing
Anne Preven – song writing, producing
Priscilla Renea – song writing, producing
Oliver Goldstein – song writing, producing
Hideaki Jinbu – mixing, engineer
Tom Coyne – mastering
Invaderous – remixing
Fz – (sfpr member) remixing
Avex Trax – FEMM's record label
Avex Entertainment Inc. – Femm's distribution label

References

External links
Femm-Isation – FEMM's official website.
Femm-Isation (Instrumental) – FEMM's official website.

2016 EPs